Evelyne Leu (born 7 July 1976) is a former Swiss freestyle skier. 

She won a gold medal in Aerial skiing at the 2006 Winter Olympics. However, she failed to reach the Finals at the 2010 Winter Olympics when she crashed in her second jump during qualifying.

She retired in April 2010.

External links
 https://web.archive.org/web/20060308045828/http://www.evelyneleu.ch/

Swiss female freestyle skiers
Freestyle skiers at the 1998 Winter Olympics
Freestyle skiers at the 2002 Winter Olympics
Freestyle skiers at the 2006 Winter Olympics
Freestyle skiers at the 2010 Winter Olympics
Living people
1976 births
Olympic gold medalists for Switzerland
Olympic freestyle skiers of Switzerland
Olympic medalists in freestyle skiing
Medalists at the 2006 Winter Olympics
20th-century Swiss women
21st-century Swiss women